Captain Demonio is a 1950 Italian historical adventure film directed by Carlo Borghesio and starring Adriano Rimoldi, María Martín and Luisella Beghi.

Plot 
In 1700 in Florence, the adventurer Capitan Demonio saves and then falls in love with him, a dancer from the snares of the Bargello.

Cast
 Adriano Rimoldi as Capitan Demonio
 María Martín as Ballerina
 Luisella Beghi
 Otello Toso
 Nerio Bernardi as Il granduca
 Luigi Tosi as Il bargello
 Beniamino Maggio
 Jole Fierro
 Renato De Carmine
 Pietro Tordi
 Ria Teresa Legnani
 Carlo Ninchi
 Arrigo Peri
 Rodolfo Terlizzi
 Alberto Archetti
 Gianni Lova
 Luigi Benvenuti
 Nella Bartoli
 John Pasetti

References

Bibliography 
 Mariapia Command. Sulla carta: storia e storie della sceneggiatura in Italia. Lindau, 2006.

External links 
 

1950s historical adventure films
Italian historical adventure films
1950 films
1950s Italian-language films
Films directed by Carlo Borghesio
Films scored by Mario Nascimbene
Films set in the 18th century
Italian swashbuckler films
Films with screenplays by Mario Amendola
Italian black-and-white films
1950s Italian films